Thomas Richard Fogerty (November 9, 1941 – September 6, 1990) was an American musician, best known as the rhythm guitarist for Creedence Clearwater Revival. He was posthumously inducted into the Rock and Roll Hall of Fame in 1993.

Biography
Tom Fogerty was born in Berkeley, California, United States. He began singing rock and roll in high school. He and his younger brother, John, had separate groups. Tom's band, Spider Webb and the Insects (which featured Jeremy Levine of the Seeds), signed a recording contract with Del-Fi Records but broke up in 1959 before releasing any records. The Blue Velvets—a group led by John—began backing Tom. Eventually Tom joined the band, and the group recorded three singles (with Tom on lead vocals) for Orchestra Records in 1961 and 1962. By the mid 1960s, the group had been renamed The Golliwogs and were recording with Fantasy Records, with Tom and John sharing lead vocal duties. In 1968, the band was again renamed—this time to Creedence Clearwater Revival—and John had become full-time lead singer and primary songwriter. During the few years of the life of CCR, Tom sang backing vocals and wrote songs, but only one of his songs from when CCR was named the Golliwogs ("Walking on the Water") was re-recorded and chosen to be put on CCR's debut album. This lack of vocal and songwriting opportunity, along with festering, long-standing animosity with his brother, led him to leave the band in early 1971, after finishing the recording of Pendulum.

After leaving the band, Fogerty began performing and recording as a solo artist. He had minor hits like "Goodbye Media Man", "Cast The First Stone", "Joyful Resurrection", and "B.A.R.T". He remained with Fantasy Records and his 1971 solo debut album, Tom Fogerty, reached No. 78 on the Billboard 200 chart. In 1971 and 1972 Fogerty played rhythm guitar in the Saunders-Garcia band, mostly in Bay Area clubs. On his follow-up album, Excalibur, Jerry Garcia and Merl Saunders played on the sessions. Stu Cook and Doug Clifford (CCR's former bass guitarist and drummer) as well as John Fogerty performed on the 1974 follow-up album, Zephyr National. The song "Mystic Isle Avalon" features a complete reunion of CCR though John Fogerty recorded his parts separately. It was the only song that John played on and the last time all four members of CCR would play on the same studio album.

Cook and Clifford also backed Tom on his fourth LP release of 1974 titled Myopia.

Throughout the rest of the 1970s and 1980s, Tom Fogerty continued to record, both solo and as part of the group Ruby.

Later, Tom re-signed with Fantasy. At the October 1980 reception for Tom's marriage to Tricia Clapper, all four members of CCR reunited and performed for the first time in a decade. They took the stage once more for a final time at a school reunion three years later. Tom Fogerty lived in Scottsdale, Arizona, for the remainder of his life.

Death
At some point in the 1980s, Fogerty underwent back surgery, and was given a blood transfusion that was not screened for HIV. This caused him to become infected with the virus and subsequently resulted in his contraction of AIDS alongside his ensuing complications with tuberculosis, all of which eventually led to his death on September 6, 1990.  After his death, a music compilation titled The Very Best of Tom Fogerty was released.

Fogerty was survived by his second wife Tricia Clapper and six children.

Discography

 Tom Fogerty (1972) US 180
 Excalibur (1972)
 Zephyr National (1974)
 Myopia (1974)
 Deal It Out (1981)
 Sidekicks  (with Randy Oda) (released posthumously in 1992)
 The Very Best of Tom Fogerty (1999)

with Ruby
 Ruby (1976)
 Rock & Roll Madness (1978)
 Precious Gems (1984)

Other appearances

Citations

References

External links

1941 births
1990 deaths
20th-century American musicians
20th-century deaths from tuberculosis
AIDS-related deaths in Arizona
American male guitarists
American rock guitarists
Creedence Clearwater Revival members
Guitarists from California
John Fogerty
Musicians from Berkeley, California
People from Contra Costa County, California
Rhythm guitarists
20th-century American guitarists
Tuberculosis deaths in Arizona
20th-century American male musicians